Bascom is an unincorporated community in Rosebud County, Montana, United States.

Notes

Unincorporated communities in Rosebud County, Montana
Unincorporated communities in Montana